Aq Cheshmeh (also Romanized as Āq Cheshmeh; also known as Āqā Cheshmeh) is a village in Shahidabad Rural District, Mashhad-e Morghab District, Khorrambid County, Fars Province, Iran. At the 2006 census, its population was 83, in 21 families.

References 

Populated places in Khorrambid County